Jalan Bukit Badong (Selangor state route B35) is a major road in Selangor, Malaysia.

List of junctions

Roads in Selangor